The Beregadougou Classified Forest is a national park found in Burkina Faso. It was established in 1953. This site is 50 km2.

In November 2017, the project Support the development of cashew nuts in the Comoé basin for the reduction of emissions from deforestation and forest degradation (PADA / REDD+) was launched in Bérégadougou.

References

Protected areas of Burkina Faso
Protected areas established in 1953